Tonina "Nina" Dimech (born 22 December 1960) is a Maltese footballer who plays as a goalkeeper for First Division club Birkirkara FC. She has officially played for the senior Malta women's national team.

Dimech last capped for Malta at senior level during the 2011 FIFA Women's World Cup qualification – UEFA Group 5 in a 1–5 away loss to Turkey on 11 April 2010, at 49 years, 3 months and 20 days old. She surpassed MacDonald Taylor Sr. as the oldest player (both genders) to appear in a FIFA World Cup qualifying match.

Dimech's most recent league appearance was on 18 February 2020, at 59 years, 1 month and 28 days old.

References

1960 births
Living people
Women's association football goalkeepers
Maltese women's footballers
Malta women's international footballers
Melita F.C. players
Birkirkara F.C. (women) players